William Soares da Silva (born 30 December 1988), sometimes known as just Soares, is a Brazilian footballer who plays as a defensive midfielder.

Football career

Vila Nova
Born in Goiânia, Goiás, Soares joined Vila Nova Futebol Clube's youth system in 2007. After two years with Vila Nova's reserves, he made his debut on 29 September 2009, against Juventude.

Porto and loan to Portimonense
After two season in first team, Soares was moved to Porto, and then was loaned to Portimonense. A investor, used a proxy club Grêmio Esportivo Anápolis, retained 20% economic rights on the future transfer fee received by Porto. Porto had an option to purchase it on or before 30 June 2013.

Recreativo (loan)
In the following season, Soares was loaned again, this time to Recreativo de Huelva in the Spanish second level.

Gil Vicente
On 23 May 2019, Gil Vicente announced the signing of Soares on a one-year deal.

CFR Cluj
On 19 October 2020, Soares joined Romanian club CFR Cluj.

Honours

CFR Cluj
Liga I: 2020–21
Supercupa României: 2020

References

External links

1988 births
Living people
Sportspeople from Goiânia
Brazilian footballers
Association football midfielders
Campeonato Brasileiro Série B players
Vila Nova Futebol Clube players
Primeira Liga players
Liga Portugal 2 players
Liga I players
FC Porto players
Portimonense S.C. players
F.C. Arouca players
Rio Ave F.C. players
C.F. União players
C.D. Cova da Piedade players
Recreativo de Huelva players
Gil Vicente F.C. players
CFR Cluj players
Brazilian expatriate footballers
Expatriate footballers in Portugal
Brazilian expatriate sportspeople in Portugal
Expatriate footballers in Spain
Brazilian expatriate sportspeople in Spain
Expatriate footballers in Romania
Brazilian expatriate sportspeople in Romania